The Reunion is a 2013 Swedish drama film directed by Anna Odell. The film won the Guldbagge Award for Best Film at the 49th Guldbagge Awards.

Cast
 Anna Odell as Anna
 Sandra Andreis as Louise
 Kamila Benhamza as Camilla
 Anders Berg as Anders
 Jimmy Carlberg as Jimmy C
 Erik Ehn as Erik
 Niklas Engdahl as Nille
 Per Fenger-Krog as Per
 Robert Fransson as Robban

References

External links
 
 

2013 films
2013 drama films
Swedish drama films
2010s Swedish-language films
Best Film Guldbagge Award winners
2010s Swedish films